The 1984–85 season was Paris Saint-Germain's 15th season in existence. PSG played their home league games at the Parc des Princes in Paris, registering an average attendance of 16,438 spectators per match. The club was presided by Francis Borelli. The team was coached by Georges Peyroche until March 1985. Christian Coste took over as manager in April 1985. Dominique Bathenay was the team captain.

Summary

Deprived of legend Mustapha Dahleb, who left after ten years at the club, Paris experienced a difficult 1984–85 campaign. Georges Peyroche was sacked by Francis Borelli in March 1985 due to poor results, but his replacement, Christian Coste, could not steady ship and PSG finished the league in 13th place. The Red and Blues still managed to reach the 1985 Coupe de France Final, its third in four years. This time, however, PSG lost to Monaco (0–1). They were also shocked by surprise finalists Videoton in the second round of the UEFA Cup. The capital club lost both matches, the first of them a blushing 2–4 defeat at the Parc des Princes. As usual, Safet Sušić provided the highlight of the season by assisting five goals in PSG's 7–1 home win over Bastia in September 1984, a club record that still stands today.

Players 

As of the 1984–85 season.

Squad

Transfers 

As of the 1984–85 season.

Arrivals

Departures

Kits 

French radio RTL was the shirt sponsor. French sportswear brand Le Coq Sportif was the kit manufacturer.

Friendly tournaments

Coupe d'Été

Second round (Group 3)

Final phase

Tournoi de Paris

Tournoi de Genève

Tournoi Indoor de Paris-Bercy

First group stage (Group B)

Second group stage (Ranking Group)

Competitions

Overview

Division 1

League table

Results by round

Matches

Coupe de France

Round of 64

Round of 32

Round of 16

Quarter-finals

Semi-finals

Final

UEFA Cup

First round

Second round

Statistics 

As of the 1984–85 season.

Appearances and goals 

|-
!colspan="16" style="background:#dcdcdc; text-align:center"|Goalkeepers

|-
!colspan="16" style="background:#dcdcdc; text-align:center"|Defenders

|-
!colspan="16" style="background:#dcdcdc; text-align:center"|Midfielders

|-
!colspan="16" style="background:#dcdcdc; text-align:center"|Forwards

|-

References

External links 

Official websites
 PSG.FR - Site officiel du Paris Saint-Germain
 Paris Saint-Germain - Ligue 1 
 Paris Saint-Germain - UEFA.com

Paris Saint-Germain F.C. seasons
Association football clubs 1984–85 season
French football clubs 1984–85 season